Midoil (formerly, Midland) is an unincorporated community in Kern County, California.

Midoil is no longer a permanently populated place.  It is within the zone of active operations of the Midway-Sunset Oil Field, about midway between Fellows and Taft, along Midoil Road, which winds through the pumpjacks, pipelines, and tank batteries, roughly paralleling California State Route 33 about a mile to the northeast.  Chevron Corporation is the primary operator in the area.

A post office operated at Midland from 1908 to 1914.

References

Unincorporated communities in Kern County, California
Unincorporated communities in California